Poliopastea lamprosoma is a moth in the subfamily Arctiinae. It was described by George Hampson in 1914. It is found in Panama.

References

Moths described in 1914
Euchromiina
Moths of Central America